Rockland Furnace is a historic iron furnace located at Rockland Township, Venango County, Pennsylvania.  It was built 1832, and is a stone structure approximately 25 feet tall. It has an 11 feet wide, 10 feet tall casting arch and 9 feet wide, 9 feet tall tuyere arch.  Also on the property are the wheel pit and mill race.

It was listed on the National Register of Historic Places in 1991.

References

Industrial buildings and structures on the National Register of Historic Places in Pennsylvania
Industrial buildings completed in 1832
Buildings and structures in Venango County, Pennsylvania
National Register of Historic Places in Venango County, Pennsylvania